Divine Emotion is the ninth studio album by American singer, songwriter, musician and record producer Narada Michael Walden (credited as Narada). It was released in 1988. The album includes the single "Divine Emotions", which reached number one on the US Dance Club Songs chart, number 21 on the Hot R&B/Hip-Hop Songs chart and number eight in the UK Singles Chart. Two other singles were released from the album: "Can't Get You Outta My Head" (UK No. 93) and "Wild Thing" (US R&B No. 97).

Track listing
All tracks written by Narada Michael Walden and Jeffrey Cohen, except where noted.
"Divine Emotions" – 5:13
"Can't Get You Outta My Head" (Walden, Robert Lee Smith, David Frazer, Cohen) – 4:35
"That's the Way I Feel About Cha" (Walden, Corrado Rustici) – 4:26
"Wild Thing" – 5:02
"How Can I Make You Stay" (Walden, Sutunga Harry Austin, Walter Afanasieff) – 4:30
"Explosion" – 5:20
"I Belong" – 4:43
"But What Up Doh?" – 4:00
"Certain Kind of Lover" – 4:35
"Jam the Night" – 5:05
"We Still Have a Dream" (Walden) – 3:27

Charts

References

External links
Divine Emotion at Discogs

1988 albums
Albums produced by Narada Michael Walden
Reprise Records albums
Narada Michael Walden albums